High fidelity or hi-fi is most commonly a term for the high-quality reproduction of sound or images.

High Fidelity or Hi-Fi may also refer to:

Arts, entertainment, and media

Literature 
 High Fidelity (novel), a 1995 novel by British author Nick Hornby

Music

Groups
 Hi-Fi (band), Russian pop and dance group
Hi-Fi (American band)
 The High Fidelity, a British band

Albums
 Hi Fi (album), an album by Hugh Cornwell
 Hi Fi, a Tommy James album
 Hi-Fi (album), an album by Compulsion

Songs
 "High Fidelity" (song), a song by Elvis Costello and the Attractions
 "High Fidelity", a song by Daft Punk from their 1997 album Homework
 "High Fidelity", a song from the Jurassic 5 album Power in Numbers
 "Hi Fidelity", a song by The Kids from "Fame"
 "Hi-Fi", a song by Suede on their 1999 album Head Music
 "High Fidelity", a song by New Zealand pop singer Alisa Xayalith

Film
 High Fidelity (film), a 2000 film based on Nick Hornby's novel

Television
 HIFI (TV channel), a Canadian TV channel focusing on music and arts programming
 "High Fidelity" (Degrassi: The Next Generation), a 2006 teen drama episode
 High Fidelity (TV series), a Hulu television series

Other arts, entertainment, and media
 High Fidelity (musical), a 2006 Broadway musical based on Nick Hornby's novel
 High Fidelity (magazine), an American magazine
 Hi, Fidelity (2011), a 2011 Hong Kong film directed by Calvin Poon

Other uses
 High fidelity in space mapping
 Hi-Fi murders, a crime that occurred in Ogden, Utah, in 1974
 High Fidelity Inc, a virtual world company launched by former Second Life founder Philip Rosedale
 HiFi, a range of digital signal processing equipment by Tensilica

See also 
 Lo-fi (disambiguation)
 Hi Infidelity, a 1980 music album by REO Speedwagon
 High Infidelity, a 1964 Italian comedy film
 The B-52's (album), an album sometimes erroneously called "High Fidelity"